Renascence may refer to:

 Renascence (comics) or Wind Dancer, a fictional character in the Marvel Universe
 "Renascence" (poem), a 1912 poem by Edna St. Vincent Millay
 Renascence (journal), an academic journal

See also 
 Renaissance, a historical period in Europe
 Renascença, a municipality in Paraná, Brazil